Fernan Perez de Oliva (c. 1492 – 1530 or 1533) was a Spanish man of letters.

He was born in Córdoba. After studying at Salamanca, Alcalá, Paris and Rome, he was appointed rector at Salamanca, where he died in 1530 or 1531. His Dialogo de la dignidad del hombre (1543), an unfinished work completed by Francisco Cervantes de Salazar, was written chiefly to prove the suitability of Spanish as a vehicle for philosophic discussion. He also published translations of the Amphitryon (1525), the Electra (1528) and the Hecuba (1528).

References

1490s births
1530s deaths
Spanish male writers
University of Salamanca alumni
Academic staff of the University of Salamanca